This is a list of the National Register of Historic Places listings in Montague County, Texas.

This is intended to be a complete list of properties listed on the National Register of Historic Places in Montague County, Texas. There are two properties listed on the National Register in the county. One property contains two Recorded Texas Historic Landmarks.

Current listings

The publicly disclosed locations of National Register properties may be seen in a mapping service provided.

|}

Former listings

|}

See also

National Register of Historic Places listings in Texas
Recorded Texas Historic Landmarks in Montague County

References

External links

Montague County